The discography of Filipino singer and songwriter Yeng Constantino consists of four studio albums, one live album, twenty two compilation albums, twenty three singles (including one as a featured artist), and twelve music videos.

Albums

Studio albums

Live albums

Compilation albums

Singles

As lead artist

As featured artist

Soundtracks

Other Appearances

Music videos

Notes

References

Discographies of Filipino artists
Discography